Xanthophyllum ellipticum is a plant in the family Polygalaceae. The specific epithet  is from the Latin meaning "elliptical", referring to the leaves.

Description
The smooth bark is grey or reddish brown. The flowers are white or pale yellow, drying brown or dark orange. The round fruits are initially orange, drying to brown or blackish.

Distribution and habitat
Xanthophyllum ellipticum grows naturally in Thailand, Sumatra, Peninsular Malaysia, Singapore and Borneo. Its habitat is lowland forests from sea-level to  altitude.

References

ellipticum
Flora of Thailand
Flora of Sumatra
Flora of Malaya
Flora of Borneo
Plants described in 1864
Taxa named by Friedrich Anton Wilhelm Miquel